This is a list of schools in the London Borough of Islington, England

In 2000, CEA, a private firm, took over the running of Islington's state schools. The education service returned to the Council in 2011.  Islington schools have improved rapidly, with GCSE results in 2014 above both the national and London average. In 2010 GCSE results in the borough were 143rd out of 152 local authorities. By 2014 they had risen to 34th in the country.

State-funded schools

Primary schools

Ambler Primary School 
Ashmount Primary School
Blessed Sacrament RC Primary School
Canonbury Primary School
Christ the King RC Primary School
City of London Primary Academy Islington
Copenhagen Primary School
Drayton Park Primary School
Duncombe Primary School
Gillespie Primary School
Grafton Primary School
Hanover Primary School
Hargrave Park Primary School
Highbury Quadrant Primary School
Hugh Myddelton Primary School
Hungerford School
Laycock Primary School
Montem Primary School
Moreland Primary School
The New North Academy
Newington Green Primary School
Pakeman Primary School
Pooles Park Primary School
Prior Weston Primary School
Robert Blair Primary School
Rotherfield Primary School
Sacred Heart RC Primary School
St Andrew's CE Primary School
St Joan of Arc RC Primary School
St John the Evangelist RC Primary School
St John's Highbury Vale CE Primary School
St John's Upper Holloway CE Primary School
St Joseph's RC Primary School
St Jude & St Paul's CE Primary School
St Luke's CE Primary School
St Mark's CE Primary School
St Mary Magdalene Academy
St Mary's CE Primary School
St Peter & St Paul RC Primary School
Thornhill Primary School
Tufnell Park Primary School
Vittoria Primary School
Whitehall Park School
William Tyndale Primary School
Winton Primary School
Yerbury Primary School

source

Secondary schools

Arts and Media School, Islington
Beacon High
Central Foundation Boys' School
City of London Academy Highbury Grove
City of London Academy Highgate Hill
City of London Academy Islington
Elizabeth Garrett Anderson School
Highbury Fields School
St Aloysius' College
St Mary Magdalene Academy

source

Special and alternative schools

The Bridge Integrated Learning Space
The Bridge School
New River College Medical
New River College Primary
New River College Secondary
The Pears Family School
Richard Cloudesley School
St Mary Magdalene Academy: the Courtyard
Samuel Rhodes MLD School

Further education
London Screen Academy
City and Islington College
Tech City College

Independent schools

Primary and preparatory schools
The Children's House Upper School
Dallington School
Dania School
The Gower School
St Paul's Steiner School

Senior and all-through schools
North Bridge House School

Further education
Italia Conti Academy of Theatre Arts
Malvern House London
Musical Theatre Academy

References

External links 
Education and Learning in Islington

 
Islington